The Mayor of Lawrence is the head of the municipal government in Lawrence, Massachusetts. There was no Mayor of Lawrence from April 14, 1847 until March 21, 1853, because up to that point Lawrence was still incorporated as a town.   The Town of Lawrence was administered by the Board of Selectmen.

List of mayors

Notes

References
Arrington, Benjamin F. Arrington: Municipal history of Essex County in Massachusetts, Volume 2 (1922).
Hayes, Jonathan Franklin Chesley: History of the city of Lawrence, Lawrence, Ma.: (1868).
Merrill, C.G.: The Lawrence gazetteer : containing a record of the important events in Lawrence and vicinity from 1845 to 1894, also, a history of the corporations, industrial establishments, churches, societies, clubs, and other organizations; national, state and municipal statistics, and a variety of useful information (1894).
Wadsworth, Horace Andrew, History of Lawrence, Massachusetts: with Portraits and Biographical Sketches, Lawrence, Ma.: Lawrence Eagle Steam Job Printing Office. (1880).

Lawrence